Inquisitor ischnos is an extinct species of sea snail, a marine gastropod mollusk in the family Pseudomelatomidae, the turrids and allies.

Description
The length of the shell attains 30.5 mm.

Distribution
This extinct marine species was found in Miocene strata of Central Chile.

References

 Philippi, Rodolfo Amando. Die tertiären und quartären Versteinerungen Chiles. FA Brockhaus, 1887.

External links
 

ischnos
Gastropods described in 1887